Kim Eun-jung (born 8 April 1979) is a South Korean retired footballer who played as a striker. He is currently a coach at Tubize after joining the team in 2015 as a youth scout.

He played in the South Korea national team at 1998 Asian Games in Bangkok and 2004 AFC Asian Cup in China. He was also a member of South Korea under-23 team at 2002 Asian Games in Busan.

He was a member of 30–30 Club since 3 May 2008 at K League. He is now a member of 50–50 club members.

Club career 
He started his pro football career with the newly formed team Daejeon Citizen in 1997. He won the 2001 Korean FA Cup, the club's first major title. He went through the Japanese club Vegalta Sendai in 2003; one year after he returned to South Korea he nested at FC Seoul in Seoul.

In 2009, he moved to the Chinese Super League on the side of Changsha Ginde. In 2010, he returned to K League with moving to Jeju United. After a two-year stint with Jeju, he was traded to Gangwon FC for Seo Dong-hyeon on 21 November 2011. He was on loan to Pohang Steelers for the 2013 season.

Club statistics

National team statistics

International Caps

International goals
Results list South Korea's goal tally first.

Honors

Club 
Daejeon Citizen
 Korean FA Cup winner: 2001
 Korean Super Cup runner-up: 2002

FC Seoul
 K League runner-up: 2008
 Korean League Cup winner: 2006
 runner-up: 2007

Jeju United
 K League runner-up: 2010

Pohang Steelers
 K League winner: 2013

Individual 
 2001 Korean FA Cup Top scorer
 2001 Korean FA Cup Most Valuable Player
 2002 Order of Sport Merit – Fierce Tager (Hangul: 맹호장))
 2004 K League All-Star Game Most Valuable Player
 2006 K League Best XI (forward)
 2010 K League Best XI (forward)
 2010 K League Most Valuable Player

National team 
 Asian Games Bronze medalist : 2002

See also 
 List of K League 40-40 club members

References

External links
 
 Kim Eun-jung – National Team Stats at KFA 
 
 

1979 births
Living people
Association football forwards
South Korean footballers
South Korean expatriate footballers
South Korea international footballers
Daejeon Hana Citizen FC players
Vegalta Sendai players
FC Seoul players
Jeju United FC players
Gangwon FC players
Pohang Steelers players
K League 1 players
K League 2 players
K League 1 Most Valuable Player Award winners
Chinese Super League players
J1 League players
Expatriate footballers in Japan
Expatriate footballers in China
Footballers from Seoul
South Korean expatriate sportspeople in Japan
South Korean expatriate sportspeople in China
Changsha Ginde players
2004 AFC Asian Cup players
Asian Games medalists in football
Footballers at the 1998 Asian Games
Footballers at the 2002 Asian Games
Asian Games bronze medalists for South Korea
Medalists at the 2002 Asian Games
South Korean Buddhists
A.F.C. Tubize managers